Francisco Fernando Solís Peón (14 July 1968 – 14 March 2022) was a Mexican politician.

Biography
A member of the National Action Party, he served in the Legislative Assembly of Mexico City from 2000 to 2003. 

He died of complications from COVID-19 in Mérida on 14 March 2022, at the age of 53.

References

1968 births
2022 deaths
21st-century Mexican politicians
National Action Party (Mexico) politicians
Members of the Congress of Mexico City
Deaths from the COVID-19 pandemic in Mexico
Escuela Libre de Derecho alumni